The Campaign for Safe Road Design is a partnership between 13 UK major road safety stakeholders that is calling for the UK Government to invest in a safe road infrastructure which in their view could cut deaths on British roads by 33%.

Aims
The key points of the Campaign are:

 Safe road design will cut road deaths and injuries by a third
 10,000 fewer deaths and serious injuries saves GBP6billion a year
 Safe road design gives the economy its best rate of return
 Government must build safe road design into 10-year plan

Background
In recent years the UK has fallen behind other European countries in terms of road deaths. In the last 10 years 375,000 have been killed or seriously injured on Britain's roads.  

It is estimated that a formal safe road infrastructure programme in the UK could reduce the number of accidents on Britain's roads by a third. However, there is poor public appreciation in the UK of the role that safe road design has in reducing road casualties. The Campaign cite research into this subject undertaken by EuroRAP across three EU countries which found that in the UK only 20% of respondents thought that safe roads would save the most lives, whereas in Sweden and Netherlands the figure was as much as 37%.

Partners
The Campaign is led by 13 key stakeholders in UK road safety. They are: AA, County Surveyors Society, EuroRAP, Freight Transport Association, IAM Motoring Trust, Chartered Institution of Highways and Transportation, Institute of Highway Engineers, PACTS, Prince Michael International Road Safety Award, RAC Foundation, Road Haulage Association, Road Safe, Road Safety Foundation.

European expansion
The UK Campaign for Safe Road Design has proved to be a success having influenced the UK Department for Transport to support the increase of EuroRAP risk rate mapping to the wider road network in the UK. Following this success EuroRAP has organised a European Campaign for Safe Road Design along the lines of the UK campaign. The European campaign features 28 partners across Europe and aims to influence the EC to use Safe Road Infrastructure Initiatives to cut casualties by 50,000 a year for the next decade, which is the equivalent of €50 billion over the decade or 0.5% of GDP.

References

External links
 Road Safety Foundation: Campaign for Safe Road Design
 EuroRAP - Safe Road Design to Save UK GBP 6BN Every Year
 RoadSafe News July 2008 - Safe Roads
 Campaign For Safe Road Design Video

Road safety organizations
Transport charities based in the United Kingdom
Transport policy in the United Kingdom
Road safety in the United Kingdom